Relativity Music Group was a record label owned by Relativity Media and INgrooves to release motion picture soundtracks. It was founded in 2009 and has grown rapidly to be a strong force in soundtrack album releases around the globe.

Relativity Music Group has released soundtrack albums for some of Hollywood's biggest films, including: Dear John, Love Happens, Couples Retreat, Zombieland, A Single Man, MacGruber, Repo Men, Brothers, The Spy Next Door and The Perfect Getaway.

It became inactive in 2016 after its parent company Relativity went banktrupt.

Discography

Resources
 

American record labels
Record labels established in 2009
Soundtrack record labels